The 195th Ohio Infantry Regiment, sometimes 195th Ohio Volunteer Infantry (or 195th OVI) was an infantry regiment in the Union Army during the American Civil War.

Service
The 195th Ohio Infantry was organized at Camp Chase in Columbus, Ohio, and mustered in March 14 through March 20, 1865, for one year service under the command of Colonel Henry Blackstone Banning.

The regiment left Ohio for Harpers Ferry, West Virginia, March 22–25; then to Winchester, Virginia, and was assigned to Brooks' Provisional Division, Army of the Shenandoah. Ordered to Alexandria, Virginia, April 28 and served provost duty there until December.

The 195th Ohio Infantry mustered out of service December 18, 1865, at Alexandria, Virginia.

Casualties
The regiment lost a total of 32 enlisted men during service, all due to disease.

Commanders
 Colonel Henry Blackstone Banning

Notable members
 Colonel Henry Blackstone Banning - U.S. Representative from Ohio, 1873-1879
 Lt. Colonel Marcellus J.W. Holter - Brevet Brigadier General, USV

See also

 List of Ohio Civil War units
 Ohio in the Civil War

References
 Dyer, Frederick H. A Compendium of the War of the Rebellion (Des Moines, IA:  Dyer Pub. Co.), 1908.
 Ohio Roster Commission. Official Roster of the Soldiers of the State of Ohio in the War on the Rebellion, 1861–1865, Compiled Under the Direction of the Roster Commission (Akron, OH: Werner Co.), 1886–1895.
 Reid, Whitelaw. Ohio in the War: Her Statesmen, Her Generals, and Soldiers (Cincinnati, OH: Moore, Wilstach, & Baldwin), 1868. 
Attribution

External links
 Ohio in the Civil War: 195th Ohio Volunteer Infantry by Larry Stevens
 National flag of the 195th Ohio Infantry
 Regimental flag of the 195th Ohio Infantry

Military units and formations established in 1865
Military units and formations disestablished in 1865
Units and formations of the Union Army from Ohio
1865 establishments in Ohio